Erie is a village in Whiteside County, Illinois, United States. The population was 1,602 at the 2010 census, up from 1,589 in 2000. It is known for its unusual layout, specifically its "town triangle".

History
Erie is named after Erie County, New York.

Geography
Erie is located at  (41.657802, -90.078931).

Demographics

As of the 2000 United States Census, there were 1,589 people, 630 households, and 466 families residing in the village. The population density was 438.2/km (1.132.7/sq mi). The racial makeup of the village was 98.80% White, 0.25% African American, 0.13% Native American, 0.38% from other races, and 0.44% from two or more races. Hispanic or Latino of any race were 0.88% of the population.

There were 630 households, out of which 33.5% had children under the age of 18 living with them, 61.4% were married couples living together, 8.6% had a female householder with no husband present, and 26.0% were non-families. 23.7% of all households were made up of individuals, and 13.7% had someone living alone who was 65 years of age or older. The average household size was 2.52 and the average family size was 2.98.

In the village, the population was spread out, with 26.0% under the age of 18, 7.6% from 18 to 24, 26.3% from 25 to 44, 22.8% from 45 to 64, and 17.3% who were 65 years of age or older. The median age was 39 years. For every 100 females, there were 87.8 males. For every 100 females age 18 and over, there were 87.6 males.

The median income for a household in the village was $41,806, and the median income for a family was $46,435. Males had a median income of $35,000 versus $21,447 for females. The per capita income for the village was $18,775. About 4.7% of families and 5.1% of the population were below the poverty line, including 8.3% of those under age 18 and 3.8% of those age 65 or over.

References

External links
Village of Erie official website

Villages in Illinois
Villages in Whiteside County, Illinois